Jack and the Beanstalk is a 1952 American family comedy film starring the comedy team of Abbott and Costello and featuring Buddy Baer, Dorothy Ford and Barbara Brown. It is a comic retelling of the "Jack and the Beanstalk" fairy tale, produced by Abbott and Costello and distributed by Warner Bros.

Plot

Eloise Larkin and her fiancé Arthur's plans to attend the rehearsal of a play are jeopardized because no one will babysit her obnoxious kid brother Donald. Eloise phones the Cosman Employment Agency, where Mr. Dinkle and Jack just happen to be seeking work. Jack flirts with Cosman employee Polly, but he is thwarted by the arrival of her boyfriend, a towering police officer. Polly sends Dinkle and Jack to babysit, but an attempt to lull the boy to sleep by reading the fairy tale Jack and the Beanstalk (Jack's "favorite novel") aloud fails when Jack stumbles over the larger words. Bemused by Jack, Donald reads the story instead — a role-reversal made complete when Jack falls asleep as Donald reads. In his slumber, Jack dreams that he is the young Jack of the fairy tale.

In his dream, Jack learns that a Giant, who lives in a castle in the sky, has taken all of the kingdom's food as well as the crown jewels. The dire situation obliges the kingdom's princess to marry a prince from a neighboring kingdom whom she has never met. Jack must also make sacrifices. His mother sends him to sell the last family possession, their beloved cow "Henry", to the local butcher, Mr. Dinklepuss. Along the way Jack meets the prince, disguised as a troubador, who is kidnapped by the Giant soon afterward. The unscrupulous Dinklepuss pays Jack five "magic" beans for the cow. Upon returning home, Jack learns that the Giant has also kidnapped the princess and Henry.

Jack's mother, exasperated over the beans, tells Jack to plant them and a gigantic beanstalk grows overnight. He decides to climb the beanstalk to rescue everyone from the Giant's clutches and retrieve "Nellie", the golden-egg laying hen that the Giant previously stole from Jack's family. Upon learning of Nellie's existence, Dinklepuss joins Jack on the adventure. When they reach the top of the beanstalk Jack and Dinklepuss are captured by the Giant and imprisoned with the prince and princess. The princess falls for the troubador only to later learn this is the same prince she was betrothed.

The Giant releases Dinklepuss and Jack from the dungeon in order to toil around his castle. They befriend his housekeeper, Polly, who helps them escape over the castle wall along with the royal prisoners, Nellie and some of the Giant's stolen gems (pilfered by the greedy Dinklepuss). They flee down the beanstalk with the Giant in pursuit. During the descent, Dinklepuss loses Nellie (who falls into the arms of Jack's mother) and then the gems, which rain down upon the impoverished townsfolk below. Once all reach the ground, Jack chops down the beanstalk, sending the Giant falling to his death. The villagers rejoice by dancing around the hole the Giant made from his fall.

Just before being rewarded by the King for heroism, Jack is rudely awakened when Donald breaks a vase over Jack's head just as Eloise and Arthur return home from rehearsal. Jack's cries out, but receives a second blow to the head from Dinkle when he learns of his sleeping on the job, which returns Jack to his dream state. After greeting Eloise and Arthur as their storybook counterparts, Jack dances off into the night with the bravado of "Jack the Giant-Killer".

Cast
 Bud Abbott as Mr. Dinkle/Mr. Dinklepuss
 Lou Costello as Jack/Jack Strong
 Dorothy Ford as The Receptionist/Polly
 Buddy Baer as Police Sergeant Riley/The Giant
 Shaye Cogan as Eloise Larkin/The Princess
 David Stollery as Donald Larkin 
 James Alexander as Arthur/The Prince
 Barbara Brown as Mrs. Strong
 William Farnum as The King
 Arthur Shields as Patrick the Harp
 Johnny Conrad and Dancers
Mel Blanc provides the voices of the woodland animals of the Giant's land.

Production
Since Universal-International would not spend the money to make an Abbott and Costello film in color, the duo decided to produce color films themselves. Utilizing a clause in their contract with Universal that allowed the team to make one independent film per year, Costello's company, Exclusive Productions, shot this film in 1951 and Abbott's company, Woodley Productions, made a second color film, Abbott and Costello Meet Captain Kidd in 1952. Warner Bros. distributed both films but did not provide financing or production services.

Jack and the Beanstalk was filmed from July 9 through August 2, 1951 at Hal Roach Studios on sets from Joan of Arc (1948). Like The Wizard of Oz, the film's opening and closing segments were presented in sepia tone – although many of the DVD releases present these sequences in black and white – while the entire "Jack and the Beanstalk" story was filmed in Eastmancolor and presented in the SuperCineColor process (Eastmancolor in subsequent releases). Many television stations that aired the film normally transmitted black-and-white shows and movies with color equipment turned off, so they ran the sepia tone openings and closings in black and white while running the color portion in color. Animation is used to show the beanstalk growing in Jack's backyard.

Soundtrack
Songs written by Lester Lee and Bob Russell:

"Jack and the Beanstalk"
"I Fear Nothing"
"Dreamer's Cloth"
"He Never Looked Better in His Life"

A soundtrack, including songs and dialogue, was released on Decca Records on June 9, 1952.

Re-release
The film was re-released in 1960 by RKO Pictures.

Copyright
The film rights were sold to RKO in the late fifties. They did not renew the copyright in 1979, so it entered the public domain.

Home media
As this film is in the public domain, it has been released multiple times on DVD from several companies. It was released on Blu-ray three times in 2008, 2015, and 2020. On October 23, 2020, Bob Furmanek had launched a Kickstarter campaign to fund a restoration for Blu-ray which reached its $7,500 goal in two hours. ClassicFlix released the restoration on Blu-ray and DVD on July 26, 2022, in commemoration of the film's 70th anniversary.

References

External links 

 
 
 
 
 

1952 films
1950s musical fantasy films
1952 musical comedy films
American children's fantasy films
American fantasy comedy films
American musical comedy films
American parody films
Abbott and Costello films
Cinecolor films
1950s English-language films
Films about dreams
Films based on Jack and the Beanstalk
Films directed by Jean Yarbrough
Films set in castles
American musical fantasy films
Warner Bros. films
Films scored by Heinz Roemheld
1950s parody films
1950s American films